Michel Kitabdjian (7 May 1930 – 17 March 2020) was a French referee.  He officiated at the 1975 European Cup Final between Leeds United and Bayern Munich, disallowing a goal by Leeds United's Peter Lorimer for offside and denying Leeds two penalty appeals as Franz Beckenbauer first handled the ball in the box and then brought down Allan Clarke in a tackle. Leeds fans became angry at the referee, and one fan managed to access the playing field after the final whistle.  After gendarmes removed him, other Leeds fans began rioting in the stands as a result of the feeling of robbery. The official was rated incredibly poorly by FIFA officials observing the game but was not formally investigated. 

Kitabdjian also served as a FIFA referee. He officiated at the 1968 Olympic tournament in Mexico City, as well as qualifiers for the 1966, 1970, 1974, and 1978 World Cups, and the 1968, 1972, and 1976 European Championships. 

Kitabdjian had Armenian roots. He died on 17 March 2020 at the age of 89.

References

1930 births
2020 deaths
French football referees
Olympic football referees
Sportspeople from Nice
French people of Armenian descent